The FS Class E.620 was a class of third-rail electric locomotives built by Officine Meccaniche Reggiane for the Italian State Railways (FS). They were built in 1925 using motors and electrical equipment from  railcars which had been withdrawn in 1923. After World War II they were converted to 3,000 volt DC operation and became FS Class E.621.

This power was transferred to the axles via a geared final drive and through this they had a maximum speed of 85 km/h. 
They received power from a 650 V DC third rail system, with the traction current being picked up by contact shoes.

References

Further reading

    Nuovi locomotori per la linea Milano-Varese-Porto Ceresio, in "Rivista tecnica delle ferrovie italiane", anno XV, vol. XXIX, n. 1 (15 gennaio 1926), pp. 1–3.
    Giovanni Cornolò, Locomotive elettriche FS, Parma, Ermanno Albertelli Editore, 1983, pp. 43-45.
    Stefano Garzaro, Locomotive elettriche FS, editrice Elledi, 1986.
    Giovanni Cornolò Claudio Pedrazzini, Locomotive elettriche FS, Parma, Ermanno Albertelli Editore, 1983.

650 V DC locomotives
Co+Co locomotives
E.620
Railway locomotives introduced in 1925
Standard gauge locomotives of Italy